Santiago de Cuba won its first Cuban National Series in 1980, edging Villa Clara as well as Forestales and Vegueros (both from Pinar del Río Province).

Standings

References

 (Note - text is printed in a white font on a white background, depending on browser used.)

Cuban National Series seasons
Base
Base
1980 in baseball